Lenawee County is a county located in the U.S. state of Michigan. As of the 2020 United States Census, the population was 99,423. The county seat is Adrian. The county was created in 1822, from territory partitioned from Monroe County. Its governing structure was organized in 1826.

Lenawee County comprises the Adrian, MI Micropolitan Statistical Area. It is served by the Toledo Media market. 

Lenawee County is home to the Potawatomi, Ottawa, Chippewa, Iroquois, Miami, Sauk, Fox, Mascoutens and Huron tribes.

History

The county owes its formation to the 1807 Treaty of Detroit, by which the Ottawa, Ojibwe (called Chippewa by the Americans); Wyandot and Potawatomi nations ceded their claims to the United States of their traditional territories in today's southeast Michigan. However, many leaders of these tribes believed that the treaty was coercive and opposed it. They began to collaborate and organize a confederacy of resistance, led by Chief Tecumseh (Shawnee). They wanted through warfare and alliance with Great Britain to force the US from their territory. This was the period of the US War of 1812 with Great Britain. During this time, the US fought the Battle of Tippecanoe, the Battle of Lake Erie, and the Battle of Thames in this area, against both British and indigenous forces. 

The United States won the Battle of the Thames in 1813, defeating the British and their allies. Tecumseh died in the battle and his confederacy dissolved. (He became the namesake for the city of the same name in Lenawee County.) As a result of this defeat, the confederacy leaders agreed to a peace treaty, the Treaty of Ghent, which ended the war with the indigenous peoples. It affirmed US control of the land demarcated in the Treaty of Detroit, comprising much of the future state of Michigan, including what became organized as Lenawee County in the United States. 

The US continued efforts to force the tribes from these western territories. In 1830, President Andrew Jackson signed the Indian Removal Act to authorize the government to relocate  Indigenous peoples from territories east of the Mississippi River and move them west, to what became known as Indian Territory (and later Oklahoma). While Indian Removal was directed specifically at Southeast Indian tribes, it was also applied to those further north in the Midwest.

Lenawee County was organized in 1826, after being authorized and described by the Michigan legislature in 1822. It was taken from Monroe County, Michigan.

Etymology
The county's name was a neologism created by Henry Rowe Schoolcraft, a US Indian agent in the region who later became a prominent ethnologist. Married to Jane Johnston, a mixed-race woman of high-rank Ojibwe and Scots ancestry, Schoolcraft gained entry to Ojibwe language and culture through her. He later became a proponent of forced Indigenous assimilation. While working in Michigan, he named several of the newly organized counties in the area, all neologisms. 'Lenawee' is thought to be derived from a misappropriation of an Indigenous word. Scholars debate whether its origins lie in the Lenape language  leno or lenno, meaning "male," or the Shawnee lenawai.

Geography
Lenawee County is considered to be part of Southeastern Michigan.

Adjacent counties

 Jackson County, northwest
 Washtenaw County, northeast
 Monroe County, east
 Lucas County, Ohio, southeast
 Fulton County, Ohio, southwest
 Hillsdale County, west

Major highways

 (future)

Within Lenawee County's townships, north–south roads are referred to as "highways", while east–west roads are referred to as "roads".

Demographics

As of the 2000 United States Census, there were 98,890 people, 35,930 households, and 26,049 families in the county. The population density was 132 people per square mile (51/km2). There were 39,769 housing units at an average density of 53 per square mile (20/km2). The racial makeup of the county was 92.51% White, 2.12% Black or African American, 0.41% Native American, 0.46% Asian, 0.01% Pacific Islander, 3.01% from other races, and 1.49% from two or more races.  6.96% of the population were Hispanic or Latino of any race. Residents identified as being 30.4% of German, 11.6% English, 10.2% American and 9.9% Irish ancestry. Some 94.7% spoke English and 4.2% Spanish as their first language.

There were 35,930 households, out of which 34.20% had children under the age of 18 living with them, 58.70% were married couples living together, 10.00% had a female householder with no husband present, and 27.50% were non-families. 22.90% of all households were made up of individuals, and 9.70% had someone living alone who was 65 years of age or older. The average household size was 2.61 and the average family size was 3.07.

The county population contained 25.90% under the age of 18, 9.10% from 18 to 24, 28.60% from 25 to 44, 23.70% from 45 to 64, and 12.70% who were 65 years of age or older. The median age was 36 years. For every 100 females there were 100.10 males. For every 100 females age 18 and over, there were 98.00 males.

The median income for a household in the county was $45,739, and the median income for a family was $53,661. Males had a median income of $38,458 versus $25,510 for females. The per capita income for the county was $20,186. About 4.40% of families and 6.70% of the population were below the poverty line, including 7.10% of those under age 18 and 9.20% of those age 65 or over.

Government and politics
Lenawee County has been reliably Republican in national elections. Since 1884, its voters have selected the Republican Party nominee in 30 of 35 presidential elections.

The county government operates the jail, maintains rural roads, operates the major local courts, records deeds, mortgages, and vital records, administers public health regulations, and participates with the state in the provision of social services. The county
board of commissioners controls the budget and has limited authority to make laws or ordinances. In Michigan, most local government functions—police and fire, building and zoning, tax assessment, street maintenance, etc.—are the responsibility of individual cities and townships.

Adrian College and Siena Heights University are located within the county.

Voters in Lenawee County have supported candidates from both political parties in statewide elections, making it a swing county. Tecumseh and Adrian have tended to lean Democrat, while Dover, Madison, and Riga townships have tended to lean Republican. The rural areas of the county are bastions of populism and libertarianism, and the Tea Party Movement gained considerable support there. During the 2010 midterm elections, the county favored Republican Gubernatorial candidate Rick Snyder, Congressional candidate Tim Walberg, State Senate candidate Bruce Caswell, and State Representative candidates Nancy Jenkins and Mike Shirkey.

Lenawee County is located in Michigan's 7th congressional district, which is represented by Tim Walberg, a resident of the county. Walberg previously served as Lenawee's state representative. Backed by the Tea Party, Walberg won the district, which includes all of Lenawee, Jackson, Hillsdale, Branch, and Eaton counties, as well as parts of Calhoun and Washtenaw counties. He defeated incumbent Democrat Mark Schauer. Schauer had defeated Walberg in the 2008 congressional election, after Walberg's first stint in Congress. 

Most of Lenawee County is represented in the Michigan House of Representatives by Republican Dale Zorn who represents the 34th District, previously represented by Republican's Bronna Kahle and Nancy Jenkins and preceded successively by brothers Doug and Dudley Spade, both Democrats.

Lenawee is also part of the 30th and 35th districts of the Michigan House of Representatives and is represented by William Bruck and Andrew Fink respectively. Adrian is part of the 16th Senate District, represented by Joe Bellino of Monroe, Michigan 

Until the 2014 state senate election, Lenawee County was part of the 16th State Senate District, represented by Republican Bruce Caswell. The district contained all of Lenawee, Hillsdale, and Branch counties.

Elected county officials

 Prosecuting Attorney: R. Burke Castleberry Jr. (R)
 Sheriff: Troy Bevier (R)
 County Clerk: Roxann Holloway (R)
 County Treasurer: Erin Van Dyke (R)
 Register of Deeds: Carolyn S. Bater (R)
 Drain Commissioner: Jennifer Escott (R)
 County Surveyor: Kevin Pickford (R)

Current as of January 7, 2023

County Commission

District 1: David Stimpson (R)
District 2: Dustin Krasny (R), commission vice-chair
District 3: Nancy Jenkins-Arno (R)
District 4: Dawn Bales (R)
District 5: Karol "Kz" Bolton (D)
District 6: Terry Collins (R)
District 7: Kevon Martis (R)
District 8: Ralph Tillotson (R)
District 9: Jim Van Doren (R), commission chair

Current as of January, 7, 2023

Law enforcement agencies

County
Lenawee County Sheriff's Office

City/Village
Adrian City Police
Blissfield Police
Clinton Police
Hudson Police
Morenci Police
Tecumseh Police

Township
Adrian Township Police
Cambridge Township Police
Columbia Township Police
Madison Township Police
Raisin Township Police

Special
Adrian & Blissfield Railroad Police

Communities

Cities
Adrian (county seat)
Hudson
Morenci
Tecumseh

Villages
Addison
Blissfield
Britton
Cement City (partial)
Clayton
Clinton
Deerfield
Onsted

Charter townships
Adrian Charter Township
Madison Charter Township
Raisin Charter Township

Civil townships

Blissfield Township
Cambridge Township
Clinton Township
Deerfield Township
Dover Township
Fairfield Township
Franklin Township
Hudson Township
Macon Township
Medina Township
Ogden Township
Palmyra Township
Ridgeway Township
Riga Township
Rollin Township
Rome Township
Seneca Township
Tecumseh Township
Woodstock Township

Census-designated places
 Jasper (called Fairfield before 1874)
 Manitou Beach–Devils Lake

Other unincorporated communities

 Birdsall
 Cadmus
 Canandaigua
 Dover 
 East Ogden
 East Raisin
 Evans Lake
 Fairfield 
 Geneva
 Gorman
 Ridgeville
 Ridgeway
 Riga
 Springville
 Tipton 
 Weston 
 Sand Creek

See also
 List of Michigan State Historic Sites in Lenawee County, Michigan
 National Register of Historic Places listings in Lenawee County, Michigan

Notes

Further reading

External links
Lenawee County Conference & Visitors Bureau
Lenawee County Drain Commissioner
Lenawee County Government Site
Lenawee County Road Commission
Complete text of History of Lenawee County published in 1909 by the Western Historical Society

Lenawee County Directory Site

 
Michigan counties
1826 establishments in Michigan Territory
Populated places established in 1826